Vincent Street may refer to:
Vincent Street, North Perth, Western Australia
Vincent Street Historic District, Newberry, South Carolina, US